Silz may refer to the following places:

Silz, Austria, in Tyrol, Austria
Silz, Mecklenburg-Vorpommern, in Mecklenburg-Vorpommern, Germany
Silz, Rhineland-Palatinate, in Rhineland-Palatinate, Germany